Events from the year 1579 in India.

Events
 Kottayam Cheriapally built in Kerala

See also

 Timeline of Indian history

References